

437001–437100 

|-bgcolor=#f2f2f2
| colspan=4 align=center | 
|}

437101–437200 

|-id=192
| 437192 Frederikolsen ||  || Frederik Olsen (born 1943) worked all over the world as a hydrogeologist, mining exploration geologist, paleontologist, and teacher about the earth, the solar system and the universe. He also has an extensive collection of minerals, fossils and meteorites, and was a founding member of Colorado Meteorite Society. || 
|}

437201–437300 

|-bgcolor=#f2f2f2
| colspan=4 align=center | 
|}

437301–437400 

|-bgcolor=#f2f2f2
| colspan=4 align=center | 
|}

437401–437500 

|-bgcolor=#f2f2f2
| colspan=4 align=center | 
|}

437501–437600 

|-bgcolor=#f2f2f2
| colspan=4 align=center | 
|}

437601–437700 

|-bgcolor=#f2f2f2
| colspan=4 align=center | 
|}

437701–437800 

|-bgcolor=#f2f2f2
| colspan=4 align=center | 
|}

437801–437900 

|-bgcolor=#f2f2f2
| colspan=4 align=center | 
|}

437901–438000 

|-bgcolor=#f2f2f2
| colspan=4 align=center | 
|}

References 

437001-438000